Velizar (Cyrillic script: Велизар) is a Bulgarian and a Serbian masculine given name. It may refer to:

 Velizar Dimitrov (born 1979), Bulgarian footballer
 Velizar Enchev (born 1953), Bulgarian politician and journalist
 Velizar Popov (born 1976), Bulgarian football manager

Slavic masculine given names
Bulgarian masculine given names
Serbian masculine given names